Louis Bellson Swings Jule Styne is an album by American jazz drummer Louis Bellson featuring performances of tunes written by Jule Styne recorded in 1960 for the Verve label.

Reception

AllMusic awarded the album 3 stars.

Track listing
 "My Little Yellow Dress" (Jule Styne, Betty Comden, Adolph Green)
 "Time After Time" (Styne, Sammy Cahn)
 "Sunday" (Styne, Chester Conn, Bennie Krueger, Ned Miller)
 "I'll Walk Alone" (Styne, Cahn)
 "Just In Time" (Styne, Comden, Green)
 "Bye Bye Baby" (Styne, Leo Robin)
 "Everything's Coming up Roses" (Styne, Stephen Sondheim)
 "I've Heard That Song Before" (Styne, Cahn)
 "As Long As There's Music" (Styne, Cahn)
 "Three Coins in the Fountain" (Styne, Cahn)
 "The Things We Did Last Summer" (Styne, Cahn)
 "Let It Snow! Let It Snow! Let It Snow!" (Styne, Cahn) 
Recorded in Los Angeles, CA on February 1 (tracks 3, 5, 8 & 9), February 2 (tracks 4, 7, 11 & 12) and February 3 (tracks 1, 2, 6 & 10), 1960

Personnel
Louis Bellson – drums
Frank Beach, Don Fagerquist, Bob Fowler, Melvin Moore - trumpet
Nick DiMaio, Dick Noel - trombone
George Roberts - bass trombone
Juan Tizol - valve trombone
Mahlon Clark, Bill Green - alto saxophone
Buddy Collette - tenor saxophone, flute
Chuck Gentry - baritone saxophone
Jeff Clarkson - piano
Tony Rizzi - guitar
Joe Mondragon - bass
Milt Holland - percussion

References

1960 albums
Louie Bellson albums
Verve Records albums